Colias cocandica is a butterfly in the family Pieridae. It is found in Central Asia.

Description
In the male greenish yellow above, dark-scaled, with black marginal and submarginal bands, and black middle spot on the forewing, the fringes and antenna being reddish. The underside of the forewing is greyish yellow, the apex being dusted with yellow, the middle spot and the small submarginal spots being black, and the costal and distal edges red; hindwing dark yellowish green, with broad yellowish distal margin, the reddish-edged middle spot being mother-of-pearl colour and the edge of the entire wing red. The female is dark yellowish white above, being paler beneath than the male and bearing stronger markings.

Subspecies
C. c. cocandica Tadzhikistan (Turkestan Range), Kirgizia (Fergana, E.Turkestan Range, Aksu Valley, Alai Mts.)
C. c. hinducucica Verity, 1911 Afghanistan (Hindu Kush), Tadzhikistan (Pamirs)
C. c. kunjerabi Verhulst, 1999 Pakistan (Karakorum)
C. c. maja Grum-Grshimailo, 1891 Tian-Shan
C. c. nastoides Verity, 1911 Alaisky Mts.
C. c. pljushtchi Verhulst, 2000 Kirgizia (E.Tian Shan), Kazakhstan (Transili Ala Tau)

References

External links
Rusinsects

Butterflies described in 1874
cocandica
Butterflies of Asia